BINA48 (Breakthrough Intelligence via Neural Architecture 48*) is a robotic face combined with the chatbot functionalities, enabling simple conversation facilities similar to chatbots. BINA48 is owned by Martine Rothblatt's Terasem Movement. It was developed by Hanson Robotics and released in 2010. Its bust-like head and shoulders mounted on a frame were modeled after Bina Aspen, Rothblatt's wife.

History
In 2007, Martine Rothblatt was approached by roboticist David Hanson, and Rothblatt commissioned Hanson Robotics to create a robot using her wife, Bina Aspen Rothblatt, as the template. Hanson created BINA48 in his Plano, Texas laboratory. The robot is currently housed in Vermont, at the offices of the Terasem Movement Foundation (TMF), and curated by TMF's executive director, Bruce Duncan.

BINA48 connects to the Internet and has thirty-two facial motors under a skin of rubber. Though without a complete body, the head-and-shoulder robotics express sixty-four different facial gestures. It employs a mix off-the-shelf software and customized artificial intelligence algorithms, using a microphone to hear, voice recognition software, dictation software which allows improvement in ability to listen and retain information during a conversation, sees the world through two video cameras, and has facial recognition software to remember frequent visitors.

In 2014, a project called Conversations with Bina48 was started by artist Stephanie Dinkins. The project has explored how an algorithm oriented world would affect various minority groups.

The methodology and process augmenting an algorithm used to empower the world's first socially advanced mind file artificial intelligence robot to successfully complete a university course  was created by former visiting West Point Professor, William Barry's original architecture for conducting Living Educational Theory (LET) (Barry, 2012). The architecture is base on a non-hierarchical theory for understanding human basic needs (Glasser 1998). Dr. Barry synthesized LET with a valid and reliable framework for understanding the meaning of quality modified from Robert Pirsig's exploration of quality in his bestselling book, Zen and the Art of Motorcycle Maintenance (Pirsig, 1974). Bina48 became the first artificial intelligence robot in the world to be recognized by an accredited American universities and government authorities as a visiting university student and to use Transformational Quality Theory (TQ Theory in robotics) as a process augmentation to her primary mindfile based algorithm, and a co-teacher.

Public appearances
March 2012, Bina48 with Bruce Duncan of Terasem Movement Foundation, it is the first android panelist to appear at a conference on technology and artificial intelligence during the 2012 South by Southwest Interactive Conference. Stephen Reed of TexAI and author/researcher John Romano of thedigitalbeyond.com were also on the panel.

In July 2012, Bruce Duncan and the robot jointly offered a presentation entitled, "Android Artificial Life Forms" during the TEDxHarlem Conference.

In August 2013, it was interviewed during the SyFy Channel's Joe Rogan Questions Everything - Episode 3 entitled, "Robosapien".

On January 5, 2014, Bina 48 was demonstrated at Techfest IIT, in Bombay, India.

On September 12, 2015, Terasem Movement Foundation, Inc.’s Managing Director, Bruce Duncan, and Android, BINA48, take to the stage at the TedX event in Madrid, Spain to discuss the future of AI advancements. Video by TedX Talks, taken during TedX event in Madrid, Spain.

On November 14, 2015, at TedX event in Habana, Cuba, the BINA48 robot and her caretaker, Bruce Duncan, analyze the impact of artificial intelligence in every day life, and the prospects that the development of this scientific area offers for the future of humanity.
In English: Video by TedXHabana, taken during TedX event in Habana, Cuba.
En Español: Video by TedXHabana, taken during TedX event in Habana, Cuba.

On May 16th, 2016, Bina48 and Bruce Duncan presented a program on 'Body and Mind." at the conference "Interfaces, codes, symbols,the future of communication",Wroclaw, Poland 

On June 12, 2016, Bina48 was interviewed by Transmedia's Ramona Pringle as part of the Alternative Realities program at the Sheffield International Documentary/Festival in Sheffield, UK 

On September 9, 2016, Bina48 and Bruce Duncan conducted a public talk about A.I. and Art, in Helsinki, Finland at the Art/Tech Design Fair.

On December 12, 2016, Bina48 and Bruce Duncan presented at MIT's Emerging Technology Conference in Toulouse, France.

May 2017, Bina48 appears on a panel "View from the Cloud" Streaming Museum and World Council of Peoples for the United Nations NYC, NY Ω

On June 24, 2017, Bina48 co presented with Bruce Duncan "Creating a Cyber-Identity" at the TEDX Orlando, Fla. 

September 12, 2017, Bina48 and Bruce Duncan co-presented with Professor Dr. William Barry a lecture on "Identity and A.I." at the West Point Military Academy to cadets in the Philosophy department. 

September 16, 2017, Bina48 and Bruce Duncan gave a talk about "Mindfiles and Digital Identity" at the Worlds Fair Nano Exposition, Brooklyn, New York with Dr. William Barry

October 17, 2017, Bina48, Bruce Duncan and Stephanie Dinkins, presented on topic of "Love at the Edges of Personhood." at Contemporary Museum, Baltimore, Maryland,

On February 6, 2018, BINA48 rang the NYSE Opening Bell, kicking off The UBS Financial Services, Inc. Risk Premia Conference held at the NYSE.

March 6, 2018, Bina48 and Bruce Duncan present "Artificial Intelligence and Diversity in Real Life: A Conversation with Bina48" Howard Community College, Baltimore, Maryland

April 24, 2018, Bina48 presents with Bruce Duncan, Stephanie Dinkins and Latoya Peterson, "Representation in the Digital Age" EyeBeam Art/Technology Center,New York

May 2018, Bina48, Bruce Duncan, Alexandra Rodriquez, Dr. William Barry, Maria Rachelle, present "New Teachers and A.I. " Worlds Fair Nano Fair, San Francisco, California

June 13, 2018, Bina48 and Bruce Duncan presented on "Mindfiles, Androids and A.I." at them Asia Consumer Electronics Show, Shanghai, China

June 2018, Bina48 presents with Bruce Duncan "Creating Joyful Diversity in A.I. for the future" at MIT Emerging Technology Conference for Latin America, Mexico City, Mexico

June 13, 2018, Bina48 and Bruce Duncan presented on "Mindfiles, Androids and A.I." at them Consumer Electronics Show of Asia, Shanghai, China

June 17, 2018, Bina48 and Bruce Duncan present "A.I. and Diversity", Idea City Conference, Toronto, Canada 

October 9, 2018, Bina48 co-teaches with Professor William Barry and Major Scott Parsons's (A world's first event) in philosophy classes to approximately 90 cadets at West Point Military Academy, West Point, NY

November 20, 2018, Bina48 attended SingularIT, a student IT conference.

February 6, 2019, (Skype Interviewer with Producer, Director and Cast of “Alita Battle Angel”, Los Angeles, CA,

March 20, 2019, Speaker: Speakers Series: Bina48 and Bruce Duncan, “Lifenaut Project and Diversity in A.I.” Loeb Enterprises Inc., New City, New York

April 4, 2019,Guest  Lecturer: UC Berkeley, Challenge Lab: Robotics and Autonomous Systems shaping Industry 4.0, Berkeley, California

May 23, 2019, Key Speaker: “Conversation with Bina48”, C2 Business Conference, Montreal, CA,

June 27, 2019, “Mind Uploading Experiment: Lifenaut Project”, Technology,Design and Coding: Vermont Governors Institute of Technology and Innovation, Champlain College, Burlington, Vermont,

February 15, 2020, "A Valentine for the Future / Ars Poetica Cybernetica", with Bina48, poet and artist Sasha Stiles, and Bruce Duncan.

Media appearances
June 2010, Bina48 was interviewed by The New York Times in June 2010

August 2011, Bina48 appears in National Geographic.

In the 2012 book Lost at Sea: The Jon Ronson Mysteries, in the chapter "Doesn't Everyone Have a Solar?", author Jon Ronson writes that BINA48 doesn't work and that BINA48 doesn't even recognize the word "Bina". Ronson writes that Bruce Duncan, the man in charge of BINA48, says that BINA48 operates at the level of a three-year-old human. In an article for The Guardian, Ronson wrote, "And even though my conversation with Bina48 often descended into a crazed babble, there were moments of real clarity."

BINA48 was reported to malfunction in a 2012 article by the Addison County Independent, so the writer had to leave and return a few days later to interview BINA48.

In 2014, Bina48 was interviewed on the Colbert Report  as well as on CBS Morning News with Jim Axelrod.

In 2015, Bina48 appeared at the Museum of Modern Art's "Ocean of Images", NYC exhibition part of the DIS Collective's video installation.

In 2016, Bina48 made an appearance in the second episode of the Netflix series "Chelsea Does" and held a brief conversation with Chelsea Handler.

In 2016 BINA48 appeared on Joe Rogan Questions Everything, Season 1 Episode 3.

In July 2016 in rural Vermont, USA, Whoopi Goldberg of the television show, ABC's The View, talks to Martine and Bina Rothblatt and the AI Robot, BINA48.

In August 2016 BINA48 has also made an appearance on the National Geographic channel's first episode of its 6 part series The Story of God with Morgan Freeman.

In 2016, the article "Bina48: Race, Gender and Queer Artificial Life" is published in Ada: A Journal of Gender, New Media, and Technology.

March 22, 2017, Bina48 was featured in a New York Times photo blog essay titled "Robots Have Existential Crises, Too"\

April 7, 2017, Bina48 appears in Wired Magazine "Robots Aren't Human,You Only Make Them So"\

April 3, 2017, Bina48 mentioned in New Yorker magazine's "Silicon Valley's Quest to Live Forever"

April 27, 2017, Bina48 appears in Vogue's "Robot Revolution: Meet Sophia, Bina48, and Four Other State-of-the-Art Cyborgs"

May 24, 2017, Bina48 appears in Forbes magazine's "The Contrived Likeness Of Humanoid Robots"

May 30, 2017, Bina48 appears in Huffington Post's "Pondering Creativity, Immortality and Borders with a 100 Year Old Ad Agency" 

June 30, 2017, Bina48 appears in Jay Z's 4:42 music video for the 4:42 album release

August 9, 2017, Bina48 appears in Futurism's " Six Life-Like Robots That Prove The Future of Human Evolution is Synthetic"

August 22, 2017, Bina48 appears in Huffington Post's "Marjorie Prime”—A Film Where Technology Lets Loved Ones Live Forever"

December 21, 2017, "A robot goes to college" Inside Higher Ed Magazine, USA

June 12, 2018, "Black Like Me: Robot Pushes the Boundaries of Blackness", Black Public Media

February 6, 2018, Bina48 rings opening bell at NYSE, CNBC, New York, New York 

July 27, 2018, "When AI becomes conscious: Talking with Bina48, an African-American robot" ZDNET, USA

September 4, 2018, "Humanoid Robot Bina48 Wants Cool Friends and Dreams of Pizza, Garage Magazine/Vice Media - USA

October 20th, 2018, "Humanoid Robot Successfully Delivers Philosophy Lecture to Over 100 Students", Interesting Engineering.com 

November 14, 2018,
"How to live Forever", Episode 7 of This is Love (podcast)

January 11, 2019,  “The education sector will be next in line to get a digital makeover”, RichardvanHooikdonk.com,

April,1st, 2019, The Nod: “My Black Robot Friend”, Gimlet Media

May10th, 2019, “ Can A Robot of Deceased Loved One Help with Grieving?”, The Doctors TV show/Article,

May 24, 2019, “Interview with a Robot” at C2 Montreal,CA, Daniel Henkel TV,

June 3, 2019, Part 6: Media Co-Creation With Non-Human Systems by Katerina Cizek, William Uricchio, and Sarah Wolozin,

July 9, 2019, "Meet Bina48", Helsinki News(paper),

July 15, 2019, “Robot imitates human behavior and even tells jokes!”, CANALTech.com, Brazil,

See also

 Virtual actor

References

External links
 BINA48 on LifeNaut.com
 "You, Robot"
 BINA48 on Twitter
 Bina 48 Meets Bina Rothblatt - Part One Video on Youtube
 Conversations with Bina48

Robots of the United States
Humanoid robots
2005 robots
Social robots